The complex inverse Wishart distribution is a matrix probability distribution defined on complex-valued positive-definite matrices and is the complex analog of the real inverse Wishart distribution.  The complex Wishart distribution was extensively investigated by Goodman while the derivation of the inverse is shown by Shaman and others.   It has greatest application in least squares optimization theory applied to complex valued data samples in digital radio communications systems, often related to Fourier Domain complex filtering.

Letting  be the sample covariance of independent complex p-vectors  whose Hermitian covariance has complex Wishart distribution  with mean value  degrees of freedom, then the pdf of  follows the complex inverse Wishart distribution.

Density
If   is a sample from the complex Wishart distribution  such that, in the simplest case,  then  is sampled from the inverse complex Wishart distribution .

where  is the complex multivariate Gamma function

Moments

The variances and covariances of the elements of the inverse complex Wishart distribution are shown in Shaman's paper above while Maiwald and Kraus determine the 1-st through 4-th moments.

Shaman finds the first moment to be 
 

and, in the simplest case , given  , then

The vectorised covariance is

,     marginal diagonal variances
,  intra-diagonal covariances
For , we get the sparse matrix:

Eigenvalue distributions

The joint distribution of the real eigenvalues of the inverse complex (and real) Wishart are found in Edelman's paper who refers back to an earlier paper by James. In the non-singular case, the eigenvalues of the inverse Wishart are simply the inverted values for the Wishart.
Edelman also characterises the marginal distributions of the smallest and largest eigenvalues of complex and real Wishart matrices.

References

Complex distributions
Continuous distributions
Multivariate continuous distributions
Covariance and correlation
Conjugate prior distributions
Exponential family distributions